"Ways to an End" is the third studio single by British synthpop band Mirrors. The single was released in the UK on 23 August 2010 as a 7" single and as a digital download.

The song was included on Mirrors' first EP Broken by Silence three months later and released on their debut album Lights and Offerings in February 2011.

Track listing

Radioactive Man Rework

A rework of the track "Ways to an End" was released on 12 September 2011, remixed by Radioactive Man. The single was released as a digital single only through iTunes and other online stores.

Track listing

Personnel
 James New
 Ally Young
 James Arguile
 Josef Page

References

External links
 Official Website
 Skint Records
 Official German Portal

2010 singles
2010 songs